Pietro Zandomeneghi (1806-1886) was an Italian sculptor, active in the Veneto.

Biography
He was born and died in Venice. Along with his father Luigi Zandomeneghi, they completed the funeral monument to Titian located in Santa Maria dei Frari in Venice. He also completed works for Santa Maria delle Grazie in Este. He became a professor of sculpture at the Royal Academy of Fine Arts in Venice. He created some of the statues and reliefs in San Maurizio. His son Federico Zandomeneghi was a prominent impressionist painter.

References

Sculptors from Venice
1806 births
1886 deaths
19th-century Italian sculptors
Italian male sculptors
Academic staff of the Accademia di Belle Arti di Venezia
19th-century Italian male artists